Blanchard Township, Ohio, may refer to:

Blanchard Township, Hancock County, Ohio
Blanchard Township, Hardin County, Ohio
Blanchard Township, Putnam County, Ohio

Ohio township disambiguation pages